Events in the year 1995 in Gabon.

Incumbents 

 President: Omar Bongo Ondimba
 Prime Minister: Paulin Obame-Nguema

Events 

 23 July – A constitutional referendum was held in the country.

Deaths

References 

 
1990s in Gabon
Years of the 20th century in Gabon
Gabon